Sentema is a town in Wakiso District, central Uganda. The town is a municipality under Wakiso District Administration. The other municipalities in the district include:

 Entebbe Municipality
 Kira Municipality
 Nansana Municipality
 Makindye Ssabagabo Municipality

Location
The coordinates of Sentema are:0°22'14.0"N, 32°24'56.0"E (Latitude:0.370556; Longitude:32.415556).

Population
The exact population of Sentema is not known as of February 2015.

Points of interest
The following points of interest are located in Sentema:

 The offices of Sentema Town Council
 Sentema Prison - Under the administration of the Uganda Prisons Services

See also
Wakiso District
Central Region, Uganda

References

Populated places in Central Region, Uganda
Wakiso District